The Khepera is a small (5.5 cm) differential wheeled mobile robot that was developed at the LAMI laboratory of Professor Jean-Daniel Nicoud at EPFL (Lausanne, Switzerland) in the mid 1990s. It was developed by Edo. Franzi, Francesco Mondada, André Guignard and others.

Small, fast, and architectured around a Motorola 68331, it has served researchers for 10 years, widely used by over 500 universities worldwide.

Scientific impact 
The Khepera was sold to a thousand research labs and featured on the cover of the 31 August 2000 issue of Nature. It appeared again in a 2003 article.

The Khepera helped in the emergence of evolutionary robotics.

Technical details

Original version 
 Diameter: 55 mm
 Height: 30 mm
 Empty weight: 80 g
 Speed: 0.02 to 1.0 m/s
 Autonomy: 45 minutes moving
 Motorola 68331 CPU @ 16 MHz
 256 KB RAM
 512 KB EEPROM
 Running µKOS RTOS
 2 DC brushed servo motors with incremental encoders
 8 infrared proximity and ambient light sensors (SFH900)

2.0 Version 
 Motorola 68331 CPU @ 25 MHz
 512 KB RAM
 512 KB Flash
 Improved batteries and sensors

Version 4 
 800 MHz ARM Cortex-A8 Processor
 Weight: 540g
 256 MB RAM
 512 MB plus additional 8GB for data
 Battery: 7.4V Lithium Polymer, 3400mAh

Extensions 
Several extension turrets exist for the Khepera, including:
 Gripper
 1D or 2D camera, wire or wireless
 Radio emitter/receiver, low and high speed
 I/0

See also 
Webots – software that simulates and allows cross-compilation and remote control of the Khepera and other robots

References 

Notes
 Mondada, F., Franzi, E., Guignard, A. (1999), The Development of Khepera. In proceedings of First International Khepera Workshop, Paderborn, 10–11 December 1999. PDF BibTex EPFL Infoscience entry

External links

 Homepage – K-Team, the company which sells the Khepera robots

Prototype robots
Differential wheeled robots
Robots of Switzerland
Micro robots
Educational robots
1991 robots